Kim Stanley (born Patricia Kimberley Reid; February 11, 1925 – August 20, 2001) was an American actress, primarily in television and theatre, but with occasional film performances.

She began her acting career in theatre, and subsequently attended the Actors Studio in New York City, New York. She received the 1952 Theatre World Award for her role in The Chase (1952), and starred in the Broadway productions of Picnic (1953) and Bus Stop (1955). Stanley was nominated for the Tony Award for Best Actress in a Play for her roles in A Touch of the Poet (1959) and A Far Country (1962).

In the 1950s Stanley was a prolific performer in television; she later progressed to film, with a well-received performance in The Goddess (1959). She was the narrator of To Kill a Mockingbird (1962), and starred in Séance on a Wet Afternoon (1964), for which she won the New York Film Critics Circle Award for Best Actress and was nominated for the Academy Award for Best Actress. She was less active during the remainder of her career; two of her later film successes were as the mother of Frances Farmer in Frances (1982), for which she received a nomination for the Academy Award for Best Supporting Actress, and as Pancho Barnes in The Right Stuff (1983). Stanley received a Primetime Emmy Award for Outstanding Supporting Actress – Miniseries or a Movie for her performance as Big Mama in a television adaptation of Cat on a Hot Tin Roof in 1985. That same year, she was inducted into the American Theatre Hall of Fame.

Early life
Stanley was born in Tularosa, New Mexico, the daughter of Ann (née Miller), an interior decorator, and J. T. Reid, a professor of philosophy and education at the University of New Mexico, located in Albuquerque. Her father was of Irish or Scottish descent, born and raised in Texas, where he met her mother (who was of German and English ancestry). She had three older brothers (Howard Clinton Reid, a psychiatrist; Kenneth Reid, killed in pilot training during World War II; and Justin Truman Reid, a lawyer); and a half-sister (Carol Ann Reid). She was a drama major at the University of New Mexico, and later studied at the Pasadena Playhouse and adopted her maternal grandmother's surname as her stage name.

Career

Theatre
Stanley was a successful Broadway actress with only a few film roles. She was singled out by The New York Times critic Brooks Atkinson for her early work. She eventually attended the Actors Studio, studying under Elia Kazan, Lee Strasberg, and Vivian Nathan. She received the 1952 Theatre World Award for her performance as Anna Reeves in The Chase, and starred in such Broadway hits as Picnic (1953), playing Millie Owens and Bus Stop (1955), playing Cherie.

She was nominated for the 1959 Tony Award for Best Actress in a Play for A Touch of the Poet and the 1962 Tony for Best Actress in a Play for her portrayal of Elizabeth von Ritter in Henry Denker's A Far Country. Stanley also portrayed Maggie "The Cat" in Cat on a Hot Tin Roof in the original London production of the play.  In 1965, she played Masha in the London run of an Actors Studio production of Anton Chekhov's play The Three Sisters.  After a savaging of the production by local critics, she made good on her promise to never act on stage again.

Television
Stanley was a leading lady of live television drama, which flourished in New York City during the 1950s. On October 17, 1950, she starred in "The Vanishing Lady" on The Trap. Her other starring roles included Wilma, a star-struck 15-year-old girl from the U.S. Gulf Coast of Texas in Horton Foote's A Young Lady of Property, which aired on The Philco-Goodyear Television Playhouse on April 5, 1953.

Film
Her first film was The Goddess (1958), playing a tragic movie star. She starred in Séance on a Wet Afternoon (1964), winning both the National Board of Review Award for Best Actress and the New York Film Critics Circle Award for Best Actress, and was nominated for the Academy Award for Best Actress and the BAFTA Award for Best Actress in a Leading Role.

A filmed version of Strasberg-directed Three Sisters (1966) opened with Stanley reprising the role of Masha, and is the only time one can see her perform in a film alongside Geraldine Page, Sandy Dennis, Shelley Winters and other well-known names of the Actors Studio. She was nominated for an Academy Award for Best Supporting Actress and a Golden Globe Award for Best Supporting Actress – Motion Picture for her performance as Frances Farmer's possessive mother in Frances (1982). She also played Pancho Barnes in The Right Stuff (1983). Stanley was the uncredited narrator in the drama film To Kill a Mockingbird (1962). As the narrator, she represents the character Jean Louise Finch ("Scout") as an adult. Mary Badham portrays Scout as a child in the film.

She received an Emmy Award for Outstanding Single Performance by an Actress in a Leading Role for her appearance in the episode, "A Cardinal Act of Mercy" (1963), of the television series, Ben Casey (1961–1966), and an Emmy Award for Outstanding Supporting Actress in a Limited Series or a Special for her appearance in the 1984 television adaptation of Tennessee Williams's Southern melodrama Cat on a Hot Tin Roof, this time as Big Mama.

Last years

Stanley did not act during her later years, preferring the role of teacher in New York City, Los Angeles, and later Santa Fe, New Mexico, where she died.

She was inducted into the New Mexico Entertainment Hall of Fame in 2012.

Personal life
Stanley was married four times: to Bruce Hall (1945–1946), Curt Conway (1949–1956), Alfred Ryder (1958–1964), and Joseph Siegel (1964–1967). All four marriages ended in divorce.

She had three children: one by Curt Conway; one by Brooks Clift (brother of Montgomery Clift), while she was married to Conway; and one by Alfred Ryder (Laurie). During her marriage to Ryder, Stanley converted to Judaism.

Death
Stanley died of uterine cancer at a nursing home in Santa Fe at the age of 76. She was survived by her brother Justin, her three children, and several nephews and nieces.  A biography, Female Brando: the Legend of Kim Stanley (2006), by Jon Krampner, was published by Back Stage Books, a division of Watson-Guptill.

Stage work
Partial listing of stage work:

Filmography

Film

Television

See also

 List of American film actresses
 List of American television actresses

References

External links
 
 
 Telegraph obituary

1925 births
2001 deaths
20th-century American actresses
Actresses from New Mexico
Actresses from New York City
American film actresses
American people of English descent
American people of German descent
American people of Scottish descent
American stage actresses
American television actresses
Deaths from cancer in New Mexico
Converts to Judaism
Deaths from uterine cancer
Donaldson Award winners
Outstanding Performance by a Lead Actress in a Miniseries or Movie Primetime Emmy Award winners
Outstanding Performance by a Supporting Actress in a Miniseries or Movie Primetime Emmy Award winners
People from Tularosa, New Mexico
Actors from Santa Fe, New Mexico
University of New Mexico alumni
Jewish American actresses
20th-century American Jews